Rijnhal is a 5,000-capacity indoor arena located in Arnhem, Netherlands. The arena opened in 1972 and is primarily used for sports and concerts. Past notable artists that have performed at Rijnhal include AC/DC, Bon Jovi, Alice Cooper, Scorpions and Aerosmith.

References

External links
Official website

Basketball venues in the Netherlands
Indoor arenas in the Netherlands